God's Favorite is the third solo studio album by rapper N.O.R.E. The album released on June 25, 2002, by Def Jam Recordings. The single "Nothin'" reached #10 on the Billboard Hot 100, becoming his biggest hit single and his only to reach the Top 10. This album peaked at #3 on the Billboard 200 albums chart moving 120,000 units in its first week of release. In its second week of release, the album sold 64,000 additional units and dropped to number 8 on the Billboard 200.

Track listing

Charts

Weekly charts

Year-end charts

References

2002 albums
Albums produced by the Neptunes
Def Jam Recordings albums
Albums produced by Irv Gotti
Albums produced by Swizz Beatz
N.O.R.E. albums